Muzaffargarh District is a district of the Punjab province of Pakistan. Its capital is Muzaffargarh city. It lies on the bank of the Chenab River.

Administration 

The district is administratively divided into the following three tehsils (subdivisions), which contain a total of 93 Union Councils:

Demographics 
At the time of the 2017 census the district had a population of 4,328,549, of which 2,223,085 were males and 2,105,145 females. Rural population is 3,630,138 while the urban population is 698,411. The literacy rate was 47.11%.

Religion 
As per the 2017 census, Muslims made up almost the entire population with 99.78%.

Language 
At the time of the 2017 census, 88.23% of the population spoke Saraiki, 5.66% Punjabi, 4.51% Urdu and 1.07% Pashto as their first language.

Ethnicity 
The major ethnic group are the Saraiki-speaking Jatt forming the majority, with Saraiki-speaking Gujjar, Baloch, Rajputs and Pathans groups in minority.

History 
In 997 CE, Sultan Mahmud Ghaznavi, took over the Ghaznavid dynasty empire established by his father, Sultan Sebuktegin, In 1005 he conquered the Shahis in Kabul in 1005, and followed it by the conquests of Punjab region. The Delhi Sultanate and later Mughal Empire ruled the region. The Punjab region became predominantly Muslim due to missionary Sufi saints whose dargahs dot the landscape of Punjab region.

Muzaffargarh region became a part of the Muslim Sultanate of Delhi when the Persian noble Sultan Shahab-ud-Din Muhammad Ghauri conquered Punjab in 1185. Faisalabad slowly developed as medieval town and many Muslim Sufi missionaries converted the local population to Islam. During the Mughal period population increased and land under cultivation increased. After the decline of the Mughal Empire, the Sikh Empire invaded and occupied Muzaffargarh region. The Muslims faced restrictions during the Sikh rule. Between 1765 and 1846 Muzaffargarh was occupied by the Sikhs. Two main battles between British and Sikh armies were fought in this district on 22 February 1849 the British declare victory in Punjab.

Muzaffargarh was founded in 1794 by the Governor of Multan Nawab Muzaffar Khan. The Meaning of Muzaffargarh is "Fort of Muzaffar" because the old town lies inside the walls of a fort built by Nawab Muzaffar Khan of Multan. Prior to that the place was known by a shop called "Musan Hatti", on the road leading from Multan to Dera Ghazi Khan. In 1861 it became the headquarters of Muzaffargarh District.

After the independence of Pakistan in 1947, the minority Hindus and Sikhs migrated to India while the Muslim refugees from India settled in the Muzaffargarh District. Muslim refugees from East Punjab, Haryana, Jammu started arriving and crossed the border into Pakistan; many were given land in Muzaffargarh District to settle.

Muzaffargarh spreads over an area of 8,249 km2 and forms a strip between the Chenab River on its east and Indus River on its west, which pass along the Eastern and Western boundaries respectively of the district and  a triangle at Alipur tehsil of the district. The district is bounded on the north by district Layyah, on the south by Bahawalpur and Rahimyar Khan districts across the river Chenab. Districts Multan and Khanewal are on the eastern side of district Muzaffargarh, across the river Chenab. District Jhang touches it on the northeast. Dera Gahzi Khan and Rajanpur districts lie on the western side across the river Indus. It is one of oldest districts of Punjab. According to the 1998 census of Pakistan, the population of the district was 2,635,903, of which 12.75% were urban. Muzaffargarh is one of oldest districts of Punjab.

Muzaffargarh was especially hard hit by the 2010 Pakistan floods, given its position between the Chenab and Indus rivers It is spread over an area of 8,249 km2. Muzaffargarh District lies in the strip between the rivers Chenab and Indus.

Geography and climate 

The city of Muzaffargarh is located in southern Punjab province at almost the exact centre of Pakistan. The closest major city is Multan. The area around the city is a flat, alluvial plain and is ideal for agriculture, with many citrus and mango farms. There are many canals that cut across the Muzaffargarh District, providing water from nearby farms. This makes the land very fertile. However usually land close to the Chenab are usually flooded in the monsoon season.

Muzaffargarh features an arid climate with very hot summers and mild winters. The city witnesses some of the most extreme weather in the country. Dust storms are a common occurrence within the city.

The district's towns include Basti Malik Wala, Taliri, Mauza Bahadur Dawana, Dawana Bahadur Peer Rajan Bukhsh, Kot Addu,   Khangarh and Hayat Nagar.

Education 
Although Muzaffargarh is one of the oldest and largest districts of Pakistan by area and population, it still has only a single campus of Virtual University of Pakistan. The literacy rate is one of the lowest in the country. District Muzaffargarh has a total of 1,072 male and 1,009 female public sector schools. According to the School Education Department's data, a total of 5,023 male and 4,130 female teachers are employed in public school education sector of the district.

Forests 
An area of 100,864 acres is forested in the district biggest among Lashari wala Forest. There is also linear plantation of 1250 A.V. mile the roads/rails/canals in the district. Trees grown in the area are kikar, shisham, millbury, eucalyptus, bamboo and coconut.

References

External links 

 
Districts of Punjab, Pakistan

sv:Muzaffargarh